Deh-e Hajji Abdol Rahim Rakhshani (also Romanized as Deh-e Ḩājjī ʿAbdol Raḩīm Rakhshānī) is a village in Dust Mohammad Rural District, in the Central District of Hirmand County, Sistan and Baluchestan Province, Iran. In the 2006 Iranian census the village was home to 26 families, totaling 128 people.

References 

Populated places in Hirmand County